Varanus spinulosus, the Solomon Island spiny monitor, Isabel monitor, or spiny-neck monitor, is a species of monitor lizard. It is endemic to the Solomon Islands archipelago and is also known from Santa Isabel Island, San Jorge Island (Solomon Islands) and Bourgainville Island (Papua New Guinea).

Taxonomy
Varanus spinulosus was first described by Robert Mertens in 1941 from a singe male specimen, and named Varanus indicus spinulosus as a subspecies of the mangrove monitor. This species was known only by the holotype until 1989, when 5 female specimens were collected. In 1994, the taxon was elevated to specific status as Varanus spinulosus, but remained a member of the subgenus Euprepriosaurus and the V. indicus species complex until it was declared incertae sedis in 2010, when it was concluded that the species likely represented a new subgenus due to its genital morphology. In 2016, the monotypic subgenus Solomonsaurus was coined for this species based on its unique scale structure, the latter which is reflected by this taxon's specific epithet spinulosus, meaning "spiny". A 2020 phylogenetic analysis suggests that this species is the most basal species in the genus Varanus, having dispersed to the Solomon Islands shortly after they formed 30 million years ago.

Description
This species is in many respects similar to the mangrove monitors of the V. indicus species complex, but has a number of unique morphological characteristics. It has a spiny scale texture as each of the small body scales are strongly keeled and conical in shape, which is a feature unique amongst all monitor lizards. It has 3-4 rows of bright yellow spots running across its back, and has relatively large eyes.

Diet
They feed on megapode eggs and on fish, often emerging from the bush. In the intertidal zone at low tide, it is possible that they would search for dead fish.

Relationship with humans
During the 1990s, many V. spinulosus were imported under the common name “mangrove monitor” due to increased desirability in the pet trade.

References

Varanus
Reptiles of Papua New Guinea
Reptiles of the Solomon Islands
Reptiles described in 1941
Taxa named by Robert Mertens